Lift Me Up may refer to:

"Lift Me Up" (Christina Aguilera song)
"Lift Me Up" (David Guetta song)
"Lift Me Up" (Five Finger Death Punch song)
"Lift Me Up" (Geri Halliwell song)
"Lift Me Up" (Howard Jones song)
"Lift Me Up" (Kate Voegele song)
"Lift Me Up" (Lena Katina song)
"Lift Me Up" (Moby song)
"Lift Me Up" (Rihanna song)
"Lift Me Up" (Yes song)
"Lift Me Up", a song by the Afters from Light Up the Sky
"Lift Me Up", a song by the Benjamin Gate
"Lift Me Up", a song by Bruce Springsteen from The Essential Bruce Springsteen
"Lift Me Up", a song by Dirty Heads from Super Moon
"Lift Me Up", a song by Jay Rock from Follow Me Home
"Lift Me Up", a song by Jeff Lynne from Armchair Theatre
"Lift Me Up", a song by Lost Frequencies from Less Is More
"Lift Me Up", a song by Olivia Newton-John from 2
"Lift Me Up", a song by OneRepublic from Oh My My
"Lift Me Up", a song by Vince Staples from Summertime '06
"Lift Me Up", a song by Zion I and The Grouch from Heroes in the City of Dope

See also
"Lift Him Up That's All", a gospel blues song recorded in 1927 by Washington Phillips